Julius Keye (September 5, 1946 – September 13, 1984) was an American professional basketball player.

A 6'10" forward/center from South Carolina State University and Alcorn State University, Keye played six seasons (1969–1975) in the American Basketball Association as a member of the Denver Rockets and the Memphis Sounds.  He averaged 7.6 points per game and 11.0 rebounds per game in his career and represented Denver in the 1971 ABA All-Star Game.

Keye shares the ABA record (with Caldwell Jones) for blocked shots in a single game with 12, obtained against the Virginia Squires on December 14, 1972.

In 1984, Keye died of head injuries suffered during an epileptic seizure. He was 38 years old.

Notes

1946 births
1984 deaths
Alcorn State Braves basketball players
American men's basketball players
Basketball players from Georgia (U.S. state)
Boston Celtics draft picks
Centers (basketball)
Denver Rockets players
Memphis Sounds players
People from Toccoa, Georgia
Power forwards (basketball)
South Carolina State Bulldogs basketball players